WSCM-LP (100.1 FM) was a low-power radio station broadcasting a contemporary Christian music format. Licensed to Moncks Corner, South Carolina, United States, the station was owned by First Baptist Church.

The station's owners surrendered its license to the Federal Communications Commission (FCC) on August 5, 2016; the FCC cancelled the license on August 9, 2016.

References

External links
 

SCM-LP
SCM-LP
Berkeley County, South Carolina
Radio stations established in 2004
2004 establishments in South Carolina
Defunct radio stations in the United States
2016 disestablishments in South Carolina
Radio stations disestablished in 2016
Defunct religious radio stations in the United States
SCM-LP